Sai Wan Leng Kham  (born 5 August 1981) is a Burmese politician who currently serves as a House of Nationalities member of parliament for Shan State № 3 constituency.

Early life and education
He was  born on  5 August 1981 in Theinni, Shan State, Burma (Myanmar).

Political career
He is a member of the Shan Nationalities League for Democracy. In the Myanmar general election, 2015, he was elected as an Amyotha Hluttaw MP and elected representative from Shan State № 3 parliamentary constituency.

References

Shan Nationalities Democratic Party politicians
1965 births
Living people
People from Shan State